Shirgah (also Romanized as Shīrgāh and Shīr Gāh) is a city and capital of North Savadkuh County in Mazandaran Province, Iran. At the 2006 census, its population was 8,529, in 2,269 families.

Shirgah is one of four cities in Savadkuh County. It borders Zirab in the south, Ghaemshahr in the north and the Babol road in the west. It has 8,000 people, and 3,000 people in its surrounding villages.

The road connecting Tehran to Ghaemshahr passes through, as does the railway from Tehran to the north.

The job of most people in this area is farming and cultivating because it is surrounded by mountains every side except farm the north and has from lands. Its mountains called Terez in the west, Veresk in the east and Sarah sar and Shah kooh in the south.

Shirgah is the place of meeting of two rivers of Mazandaran, the Talar and Keselyan. The Talar originates from the slopes of Gadook.

That is, Shirgah has valleys and many bridges and because of this it is called the town of bridges. From these bridges, pool Dokhtar (in Chali), a historical bridge of Shah Abbas, as its name implies, was made in the Safavid era (inside the city), and Abdangesar (it is on road to Ghaemshahr) and Poole Shahpoor, are the most famous of all.

Some other bridges have also been made, such as, on railway in Sartappeh, two in the town, on the way to Ghaemshahr and outside the town.

There are only three factories in this city. The wood industries one in Chali, Pichkooban in Sartappeh and wood saturating factory that has been established in 1932 AD (1311 Iranian date) and because of less use of wood bars in rail way its production has been limited. A kind of this factory has been made in Ghazvin province that only isolated the wood. So that was the first saturating factory in Iran.shirgah is near zirab

The history of Shirgah

Not much historical studies made about Shirgah and historical stories told by person to person received to us. In this narrated (spoken) history.

It has been tried to get stories from all authorized persons and avoid accepting the unreasonable once.

It seems that the city has not much historic record, because its early residents place of this town lived in Chali and Tappesar and specially in Abdangesar

The occupation of people in this city is wood cutting and animal husbandry. During the period of going to and returning from the jungles of this area resulted in gradual migration of people in Shirgah and they made small houses that became their permanent houses. People resided in present town and its skirts that led to establishment of primitive center of Shirgah.

The residents of this city made their house on heights so that they could defend themselves against the thieves and outlaws.

At the ago of king Reza Khan a brave man called Hojabr Soltan fought Reza Khan sometimes entered Shirgah to take food, clothes, etc. from people.

During World War 2 some Russian troops have resided in a small part near Kalig Kheil (a village of Shirgah) that later came to call Russ Abad to equip rebuild and support themselves.

Kharkhoon' or Shirgah
As much as we know the former name of Shirgah was  Kharkhoon which there are three stories behind it.

The first one tells that there were many thorny bushes in its forests when wood-cutters and farmers went among the forests, their skin was cut and bleeding so it called Kharkhoon is made up of two smaller words;

khar means thorn and khoon means blood

The second comes from a story telling long before there was a ruler who had a strong lion. He told if any other animal beat my lion, it will give its owner a valuable gift. An old and learned farmer knew when a cow gets angry so much and attacks even stronger animals. So he went to the ruler's palace and stated "I have a cow that can beat the lion". And asked the ruler to bring his lion to the square of town.

All the people gather around the square and were surprised.

However, the cow which had a newborn calf and the frightening and powerful lion were taken to the square. The farmer ordered to tie the calf in a place near lion and the cow. The lion was very hungry and the cow was so angry when the lion attacked the calf, that she killed the lion on the first blow. Therefore it called Shirgav.

Shir means lion and Gov means cow. That later it called shirgah, because of pronouncing it fluently.

But another one saying that since there were many cows producing much milk it called  Shirgah that in sense Shir means milk (in dialect) and Gah means place.

It seems the third one to be more logic and acceptable than the two former stories, because naming of this area based on the third sense is interesting and scientific and there is also a relationship between the name and its meaning as Shir means humidity (in dialect) and Gah means place, because this town has a special climate in the region, Mazandaran province. It is more often rainy and humid in a year.

Waterfall  near road to Zirab city said there ( tonel). Jungle of Lafoor (name of village areas), rice fields, citrus gardens, nice villas, Keselian river, historical places and bridges, mild and cool weather in summer, natural pools suitable for swimming and so on.

That is why many visitors from different parts of the country and all over the world came to visit Shirgah. (Although it is a less populated town, it has the highest immigrants that most of them are youths).

If the healthcare and welfare facilities develop, Shirgah will certainly turn into one of the most beautiful enjoyable and attractive city in Iran.

References

Populated places in North Savadkuh County
Cities in Mazandaran Province